Jean-Paul Bruwier (born 18 February 1971) is a Belgian hurdler. He competed in the men's 400 metres hurdles at the 1996 Summer Olympics.

References

1971 births
Living people
Athletes (track and field) at the 1996 Summer Olympics
Belgian male hurdlers
Olympic athletes of Belgium
Place of birth missing (living people)